Devgarh may refer to:

 Deogarh, Rajasthan, also spelt as Devgarh, a city in Rajsamand District of India's Rajasthan state
 Devgarh, Madhya Pradesh, an historic fortress-city in Chhindwara District of India's Madhya Pradesh state
 Devgarh, Maharashtra, also known as Devgad, a coastal town in Sindhudurg District of India's Maharashtra state
 Deogarh, Uttar Pradesh, a town in Lalitpur district, Uttar Pradesh state of India

See also
 Deogarh (disambiguation)